Dana L. Shires, Jr. (born November 22, 1932) is an American physician, research scientist, and inventor. He was a member of the research team that did the work leading to the invention of Gatorade. He is the co-founder and former CEO of LifeLink Foundation, an organization created to promote, support and assist in the transplantation therapy of organs and tissues.

Early life 
Dana Shires was born in Coral Gables, Florida. His childhood was spent in Virginia and West Virginia. After the end of the Second World War, his family moved back to Florida, where he attended Lee High School, in Jacksonville. With the start of the Korean War, Shires spent three years in the Marine Corps, including a year as part of a Marine aviation squadron on a U.S. aircraft carrier. Following his stint in the Marines, Shires returned to Florida, and in 1954 started his undergraduate studies at the University of Florida. He graduated in 1957, and, inspired by an uncle who was a doctor, continued with medical school in Gainesville, graduating in 1961.

Involvement in the Invention of Gatorade 
In 1965, Dana Shires was a research fellow at the University of Florida working in the nephrology lab under Dr. Robert Cade. During a lunchtime discussion with then Gators assistant coach Dewayne Douglas, Shires became interested in the issue of the players' suffering from dehydration during practice. Douglas had described to Shires how players lost weight and experienced problems with urination. At the time, the prevailing thinking was that players should be discouraged from replenishing liquids lost to sweating during a game. Shires, who had played football in high school, had familiarity with the issue and found the problem interesting, and brought the matter to the attention of Dr. Cade. They, along with Jim Free and Alex de Quesada (two other postdoctoral fellows working in the nephrology lab under Cade), began research on dehydration during physical exertion.  During freshman football practice that year, the researchers collected and tested sweat samples. Their testing revealed that each player lost 2.5 to 4.2 liters, or up to 9 pounds, during each practice session.

Under Cade, the team's research ultimately led to the formulation of a beverage that would replenish the sodium, sugar and water lost during strenuous exercise. Originally nicknamed Cade's Cola, the beverage was eventually marketed as Gatorade, and was the first product in what is now the multibillion-dollar sports beverage industry.

Dr. Shires has stated, "...perhaps the most important thing that we did was alert people to the necessity of rehydrating in the midst of exercise."

Founding of LifeLink Foundation 
In 1982, Dr. Shires and Alex de Quesada, a colleague in the research and development of Gatorade, started the LifeLink Foundation in Tampa, Florida. According to the organization's mission statement, LifeLink is "dedicated to the recovery of life-saving and life-enhancing organs and tissue for transplantation therapy." As of 2001, LifeLink had a staff of 21 doctors, and performed more than 300 heart, kidney, liver and pancreas transplants per year. The recipients of these organs are often patients who are indigent. Dr. Shires has said, "We've done a lot of good things for people with the [Gatorade] money, and we're grateful for that."
In 2012, Dr. Shires serves as LifeLink's Chairman of the Board. His son, Dan, serves as Executive Vice President of LifeLink Tissue Bank, one of six divisions operating under the LifeLink Foundation umbrella.

Family 
Dr. Shires has eight children and sixteen grandchildren. He enjoys relaxing at a country home in Sidney Peak Ranch, CO where Dr. Shires sits in a big massage chair and loves the hot tub.

See also 
 Florida Gators
 Gatorade
 Robert Cade

References

External links 
Gatorade – Official website of Gatorade
LifeLink Foundation – Website of LifeLink Foundation
University of Florida – Official website of the University of Florida

1932 births
American medical researchers
American nephrologists
Living people
People from Coral Gables, Florida
American chief executives
American company founders